Xylota azurea is a species of hoverfly in the family Syrphidae.

Distribution
Mexico, United States.

References

Eristalinae
Insects described in 1953
Diptera of North America
Hoverflies of North America